The Bavarian C III engines were steam locomotives of the Royal Bavarian State Railways (Königlich Bayerische Staatsbahn).

Standard variant 

The standard variant of the C III was developed from the Class C II. A total of 239 examples were built, which varied somewhat in their dimensions. For example, the third batch had a boiler diameter 30 mm greater than the others. The vehicles taken over by the Reichsbahn were to have been given the numbers 53 7871–7990. However these locomotives were retired by 1925. Several engines were sent to Belgium as reparations.

These engines were coupled with Bavarian 3 T 8.95 and 3 T 10.5 tenders.

Sigl variant 

These locomotives originally built for Hungary were acquired by the firm of Sigl, because new locomotives were urgently ordered for goods services. Following a subsequent exchange of the boiler they were identical with other vehicles of this class apart from their overall weight. The locomotives taken over by the Reichsbahn were to be given the numbers 53 7831–7833 but were retired by 1925.

The vehicles were coupled with Bavarian 3 T 12 tenders.

See also
 Royal Bavarian State Railways
 List of Bavarian locomotives and railbuses

References

External links
 Railways of Germany forum

0-6-0 locomotives
C III
Standard gauge locomotives of Germany
Maffei locomotives
Krauss locomotives
Railway locomotives introduced in 1868
C n2 locomotives
Wiener Neustädter locomotives
Freight locomotives